Acleris albiscapulana is a species of moth of the family Tortricidae. It is found in Japan (Hokkaido, Honshu, Shikoku), the Korean Peninsula and the Russian Far East (Ussuri). The habitat consists of fir-yew broad-leaved and oak forests.

The wingspan is 17–20 mm. Adults have been recorded on wing from May to June and again from August to October. The species probably overwinters as an adult.

References

Moths described in 1881
albiscapulana
Moths of Asia